Mae Fah Luang University Stadium is a multi-purpose stadium in Chiang Rai Province, Thailand.  It is currently used mostly for football matches. It was the home stadium of Chiangrai United F.C. from 2009 to 2012. The stadium holds 3,346 people.

References

External links

Multi-purpose stadiums in Thailand